Sir Joseph Victor Williams  (born 1961) is a judge and the first Māori person appointed to the Supreme Court of New Zealand.

Early life
Williams was brought up in Hastings by a great-uncle and a great-aunt alongside his cousins. He is of Ngāti Pūkenga and Te Arawa descent. By 14, he was working in the freezing works to contribute to the family income. 

Williams won a scholarship and was educated at Lindisfarne College. He went on to study at Victoria University of Wellington, where he first studied Māori language and then law. He graduated in 1986 with an Bachelor of Laws degree from Victoria, and later with a Master of Laws with first-class honours in indigenous rights law from the University of British Columbia. He had worked as a junior law lecturer at Victoria University before studying his master's degree.

In the 1980s, Williams was a musician as a member of the Ngāhiwi Apanui-led band Aotearoa, known for their bilingual Pacific reggae song "Maranga Ake Ai" (1985).

Legal career 
Williams contributed to the legal team for the 1985 Treaty of Waitangi claim which led to the adoption of te reo Māori as an official language of New Zealand. In 1988 he joined Kensington Swan, where he specialised in Māori issues and environmental law. He became a partner at Kensington Swan in 1992, leaving in 1994 to co‑found Walters Williams & Co. 

In 1999, at the age of 38, he became the youngest person to be appointed Chief Judge of the Māori Land Court. In 2004, Williams was appointed the Chairperson of the Waitangi Tribunal after acting in that role for several years.

In 2008, he was appointed a Justice of the High Court of New Zealand. In 2017, he became the first Te Reo Māori speaker appointed to the Court of Appeal. He was appointed to the Supreme Court of New Zealand in May 2019, succeeding William Young. Williams is the first Māori person to be appointed to the Supreme Court.

Williams is a former Vice-President of the Māori Law Society, and a fellow of the International Academy of Trial Lawyers. He has written about tikanga Māori and New Zealand law. His future vision for New Zealand law is for a time "when tikanga Māori fuses with New Zealand’s common law tradition to form a hybrid law of Aotearoa that could be developed by judges, case by base." He gave the Ivan Kwok lecture in 2022 where he set out his views on the government's Treaty of Waitangi partnerships with Māori and the struggle of government to give effect to its treaty commitments.

Awards and honours 

In the 2020 New Year Honours, he was appointed a Knight Companion of the New Zealand Order of Merit, for services to the judiciary. His investiture ceremony took place in April 2021 at his home marae in the Coromandel town of Manaia.

Selected publications 

 Williams, Joe. (July 2001). "The Māori Land Court: A Separate Legal System?" New Zealand Centre for Public Law. https://www.wgtn.ac.nz/public-law/publications/occasional-papers/pdfs/JWilliams-web-paper.pdf 
 Williams, Joe. (June 2008). "Confessions of a Native Judge: Reflections on the role of transitional justice in the transformation of indigeneity." Native Title Research Unit. Archived at http://classic.austlii.edu.au/au/journals/LRightsLaws/2008/3.pdf.

References 

1961 births
20th-century New Zealand male singers
Court of Appeal of New Zealand judges
High Court of New Zealand judges
Knights Companion of the New Zealand Order of Merit
Living people
Māori Land Court judges
Members of the Waitangi Tribunal
20th-century New Zealand lawyers
New Zealand male musicians
New Zealand Māori judges
New Zealand Māori musicians
Pacific reggae
People educated at Lindisfarne College, New Zealand
Peter A. Allard School of Law alumni
Supreme Court of New Zealand judges
Ngāti Pūkenga people
Te Arawa people
Victoria University of Wellington alumni
21st-century New Zealand lawyers